Birma Seamount, also known as Birma Knoll, is a undersea mountain in the North Atlantic Ocean, located about  south of Cape Race in Canadian waters off Atlantic Canada. To the west, Birma Seamount is bounded by Algerine Seamount.

Birma Seamount is named after the SS Birma, a Russian steamship that responded to the RMS Titanic's distress signal following her collision with an iceberg on 15 April 1912.

References

External links

Fogo Seamounts